The Gunsan Hwamul (Cargo) Line is an abandoned cargo railway line serving North Jeolla Province in South Korea.  Before January 1, 2008, this line was called Gunsan Line which connected the major railway junction of Iksan (on the Honam Line) to the city of Gunsan.

As of January 2008, New connecting line between Janghang (Janghang Line) and Daeya opened. Iksan – Daeya was included into Janghang Line,new Gunsan station opened, old Gunsan Station was renamed Gunsan Freight Station,  passenger transportation between Daeya Station and Gunsan Freight Station was stopped and the line was renamed to Gunsan Hwamul(Cargo) Line.

As of December 2020, new connecting line (Gunsan Port Line) between Janghang Line, Okgu Line and Gunsan Port opened. Therefore Gunsan Hwamul Line is abandoned.

Line Data 
 Length: 8.9 km (+1.2km between Daeya and the junction)
 Double track: Nil
 Gauge: 1,435mm

See also 
 Korean National Railroad 
 Transportation in South Korea

References

External links 
 Korean National Railroad, for train times and other information

Railway lines in South Korea